KASW (channel 61) is a television station in Phoenix, Arizona, United States, affiliated with The CW. It is owned by the E. W. Scripps Company alongside ABC affiliate KNXV-TV (channel 15). Both stations share studios on North 44th Street on the city's east side, while KASW's primary transmitter is located on South Mountain.

KASW went on the air in 1995 as the Phoenix affiliate of The WB. Its first owner contracted with KTVK (channel 3) for programming and support services, and KTVK bought the station in 1999. In addition to being an affiliate of The WB and later The CW, the station also broadcast several secondary local sports teams at various times. KASW was split from KTVK in 2014 as the result of KTVK's sale. Scripps acquired it in 2019 and has added local newscasts from KNXV. KASW is the high-power ATSC 3.0 (NextGen TV) station for the Phoenix area and provides the ATSC 3.0 broadcasts of six major Phoenix commercial stations.

History

Prior history of UHF channel 61 in Phoenix
Prior to KASW's sign-on, the UHF channel 61 frequency in the Phoenix market was originally occupied by low-power station K61CA; that station carried a locally programmed music video format known as "Music Channel" and operated from March 15, 1983, until November 12, 1984, closing due to mounting debts and lack of cash to continue operating.

The construction permit for K61CA remained active for several more years; by 1988, it was owned by Channel 61 Development Corporation and was planned as a satellite-fed relay of KSTS, a Telemundo affiliate in San Jose, California.

In November 1987, the FCC allocated channel 61 for full-power use in Phoenix. KUSK-TV applied alongside four other groups; the field was narrowed to three, and Brooks Broadcasting, owned by Chandler farmer Gregory R. Brooks, was granted the permit in February 1991 by the FCC review board.

WB affiliation

Little activity occurred on the permit, with the call sign KAIK; Brooks considered running home shopping on the station, and he was approached by KPHO-TV about potentially splitting rights to a new major league baseball team with the station.

In December 1994, Brooks entered into a local marketing agreement with Media America Corporation, then owners of KTVK (channel 3). KTVK, in the concluding phase of losing its ABC affiliation, had acquired a large inventory of children's programs, including Fox Kids, and The WB affiliation that did not fit with its planned programming as an independent. Brooks, who was wanting to run a station catering to Phoenix's youth audience but had not been able to get the station going, was surprised when KTVK approached him; Delbert Lewis, the owner, owned a farm adjacent to one of Brooks's properties in Florence but had never met him.

KASW signed on September 23, 1995, as the first new full-power Phoenix television station since KUTP started up in December 1985. In addition to WB, Fox Kids and syndicated shows, as well as old movies on the nights when The WB did not air programming, it also aired a 30-minute newscast, known as NewsNight, produced by KTVK; the logo fit the station's youth appeal and was described by Dave Walker of The Arizona Republic as "reminiscent of an amoeba-shaped 1960s coffee table". Brooks, a member of the Church of Jesus Christ of Latter-day Saints, also aired the twice-yearly LDS General Conference on channel 61. KTVK and KASW also split over-the-air coverage rights to the Phoenix Coyotes hockey team when it moved to Phoenix in 1996, with 20 of the 25 games in the package airing on channel 61.

In July 1999, MAC America (the former Media America) announced it would sell KTVK to the Belo Corporation. Later that year, Belo announced that it would purchase KASW from Gregory Brooks, forming the first television duopoly in the Phoenix market just as they were being legalized.

From The WB to The CW
On January 24, 2006, the Warner Bros. unit of Time Warner and CBS Corporation (which had been created as a result of the split of Viacom at the start of the year) announced that the two companies would shut down The WB and UPN and combine the networks' respective programming to create a new "fifth" network called The CW. The local UPN affiliate was KUTP (channel 45), owned by Fox Television Stations. None of Fox's UPN stations, some of which were in the same market as charter network outlets owned by CBS and Tribune Broadcasting, were selected for the new network, and in late February, Fox announced it would start MyNetworkTV to serve its ex-UPN portfolio (including KUTP) and other stations that would not join The CW. On March 8, Belo signed an affiliation agreement with for KASW to become The CW's affiliate in Phoenix.

On June 13, 2013, Belo announced that KTVK and KASW would be acquired by the Gannett Company, owner of local NBC affiliate KPNX and the Arizona Republic. Since this would have given Gannett control of three stations in the Phoenix market, Gannett announced that it would spin off KTVK and KASW to Sander Media, LLC (operated by former Belo executive Jack Sander). While Gannett intended to provide services to the stations through a shared services agreement, KTVK and KASW's operations would have remained largely separate from KPNX and the Republic. On December 23, 2013, shortly after the approval and completion of the Gannett/Belo deal, the Meredith Corporation announced that it would purchase KTVK and the non-license assets of KASW from Sander Media and Gannett in a $407.5 million transaction. As Meredith already owned CBS affiliate KPHO-TV (channel 5), the KASW license was instead sold to SagamoreHill Broadcasting, with Meredith operating the station under a shared services agreement.

Sale to Nexstar and separation from KTVK
The FCC approved the sale of KASW and KTVK to SagamoreHill and Meredith on June 17, 2014, and the deal closed two days later. The two companies also agreed to voluntarily divest KASW to an independent buyer within 90 days of the deal's closure; on October 23, 2014, Meredith and SagamoreHill announced that it would sell KASW to Nexstar Broadcasting Group for $68 million, giving the company its first station in the Phoenix market. The FCC approved the sale to Nexstar on December 19, and the sale was consummated on January 30, 2015, ending the nearly 20-year partnership between KASW and KTVK. The station began migrating out of KTVK's facilities in September 2015.

Sale to Scripps 
In March 2019, Nexstar announced it would purchase Tribune Media. This acquisition required divestitures of several overlapping stations; however, in addition to stations in markets where divestiture was necessary, Nexstar opted to also sell KASW to the E. W. Scripps Company, owner of local ABC affiliate KNXV-TV (channel 15), creating Phoenix's third TV duopoly. Although other stations acquired from the Nexstar/Tribune divestitures came from the Tribune portfolio, KASW was the only Nexstar station to be bought out by Scripps. The sale was approved by the FCC on September 16 and was completed on September 19. Scripps added newscasts from KNXV and also upgraded the station's syndicated programming inventory.

Programming

Local newscasts

From 1995 to 1997, KTVK produced a half-hour 9 p.m. newscast for KASW.

After the station was sold to Scripps, KNXV-TV began producing two local newscasts for KASW; both of them debuted in a gradual basis over the course of 2020. The first of these newscasts debuted on March 30, when KASW debuted a two-hour extension of KNXV's morning newscast, anchored by a separate team of anchors from the existing morning newscast; a noon news hour followed as daytime news viewership spiked during the COVID-19 pandemic. It was followed on August 30 by a half-hour long 9 p.m. newscast, anchored by the station's evening team.

Sports programming
KASW served as the former over-the-air broadcast home of the NHL's Phoenix Coyotes, airing the team's games from the time that the franchise moved to Phoenix in 1996 until 2006, when the Coyotes announced the move of their over-the-air telecasts to KAZT-TV. From 1997 to 2004 and again in 2019, KASW broadcast Arizona Rattlers arena football, and KASW also aired games of the Phoenix Mercury from 1997 through 1999. Phoenix Rising FC soccer was seen on KASW from 2019 through 2021.

Technical information

Subchannels
The station's ATSC 1.0 channels are carried on the multiplexed digital signals of other Phoenix television stations:

Analog-to-digital conversion
KASW shut down its analog signal, over UHF channel 61, on June 12, 2009, the official date in which full-power television stations in the United States transitioned from analog to digital broadcasts. The station's digital signal continued to broadcast on its pre-transition UHF channel 49, using virtual channel 61. The station was then repacked to channel 27 in 2019.

ATSC 3.0

On March 27, 2020, this station was launched as a high-power ATSC 3.0 (NextGen TV) transmitter for Phoenix, operating alongside KFPH-CD and carrying the main program streams of KASW, KNXV, KSAZ and KUTP. It also is being used in the testing of single-frequency networks, with a second transmitter atop Shaw Butte.

On July 8, 2021, KPHO and KPNX were added to KASW from KFPH-CD, placing all four major network affiliates on the same ATSC 3.0 multiplex.

Translators

At the time of ATSC 3.0 conversion, KASW had three dedicated translators: K34EF-D in Kingman, K21EA-D in Lake Havasu City, and K34EE-D in Cottonwood.

Since conversion, programming from KASW has been seen through the translators of its ATSC 1.0 hosts. K34EE-D in Cottonwood was switched to rebroadcast KNXV-TV in June 2021. Mohave County also surrendered the licenses of its two translators carrying KASW in July 2022.

See also
Channel 27 digital TV stations in the United States
Channel 61 virtual TV stations in the United States

References

External links
 

1995 establishments in Arizona
The CW affiliates
Ion Mystery affiliates
Grit (TV network) affiliates
E. W. Scripps Company television stations
Television channels and stations established in 1995
ASW
ATSC 3.0 television stations
National Hockey League over-the-air television broadcasters